Reese's Xtreme Cup Challenge (RXCC) was an attraction which was installed in 2006 at Hersheypark, where it became the first competitive, interactive dark ride. It was built by Sally Corporation, a popular dark ride manufacturer. The ride experience theme was sports, and the building exterior was themed on the Hersheypark Arena which is directly behind, outside Hersheypark. This ride is not to be confused with the free Hershey's Chocolate World tour ride. The ride replaced a building which housed the park's first aid and ride department offices, as well as a practice skating rink.

On August 2, 2018, Hersheypark announced the addition of Reese's Cupfusion for the Summer of 2019, which will replace Reese's Xtreme Cup Challenge. Reese's Xtreme Cup Challenge closed on September 3, 2018.

Ride Facts 
 Ride system provided by EOS Rides
 Ride featured a Single Rider line
 Total number of targets: 158
 Total animated elements: 80
 Animatronic figures: 8

References

External links 
Sally Corporation

Amusement rides introduced in 2006
Amusement rides manufactured by Sally Corporation
Animatronic attractions
Hersheypark
Sally Corporation animatronics